Björn Melin (born July 4, 1981) is a Swedish former professional ice hockey forward, who most notably played with HV71 in  the Swedish Hockey League (SHL) and the Anaheim Ducks of the National Hockey League (NHL).

Playing career 
Melin played as left winger with jersey number 91. He was an energetic quick power forward who worked hard in every shift. Melin started his hockey career with HC Dalen and has played six of his first seven professional seasons with HV71 in the Swedish Elitserien.

Melin was drafted in the 1999 NHL Entry Draft by the New York Islanders with their 6th round pick, in the 163rd overall selection. Melin chose not to renew his contract with his last club HV71 in Sweden after the season 2005–06. On May 31, 2006, he signed a one-year contract with the Anaheim Ducks of the NHL. Melin started the season 2006-07 playing for the Portland Pirates in AHL. On January 7 Melin made his NHL debut and scored a goal for Anaheim Ducks against Detroit Red Wings.

After just one season in the AHL and the NHL, Melin returned to his native Sweden for play in Elitserien. In April 2007, he signed a three-year contract with his former club HV71.

Prior to the 2012–13 season, Melin signed a two-year contract with the Stockholm club AIK of the SEL to return to Sweden.

Career statistics

Regular season and playoffs

International

Statistics complete.

Awards and honors

References

External links

1981 births
AIK IF players
Anaheim Ducks players
Dinamo Riga players
HC Fribourg-Gottéron players
HV71 players
Living people
Lukko players
Malmö Redhawks players
HC Neftekhimik Nizhnekamsk players
New York Islanders draft picks
Sportspeople from Jönköping
Portland Pirates players
Swedish ice hockey left wingers